The 1998–99 Football League Cup (known as the Worthington Cup for sponsorship reasons) was the 39th staging of the Football League Cup, a knockout competition for England's top 92 football clubs.

The competition began on 11 August 1998, and ended with the final on 21 March 1999, held at Wembley Stadium.

The tournament was won by Tottenham Hotspur, who beat Leicester City 1–0 in the final, thanks to an Allan Nielsen goal in the last minute of normal time.

First round
The 72 First, Second and Third Division clubs compete from the First Round. Each section is divided equally into a pot of seeded clubs and a pot of unseeded clubs. Clubs' rankings depend upon their finishing position in the 1997–98 season.

1 Team at home in the 1st leg is denoted as the home team

Second round
The 36 winners from the First Round joined the 12 Premier League clubs not participating in European competition  in Round Two. First leg matches were played on 15 and 16 September, second leg matches were played on 22 and 23 September.

1 Team at home in the 1st leg is denoted as the home team

Third round
The 24 winners from the Second Round joined the 8 Premiership clubs participating in European competition in Round Three. Matches were played on 27 and 28 October.

Fourth round
Matches were played on 10 and 11 November.

Quarter-finals
The four matches were played on 1,  and 2 December.

Semi-finals
The semi-final draw was made in December 1998 after the conclusion of the quarter finals. Unlike the other rounds, the semi-final ties were played over two legs, with each team playing one leg at home. The first leg matches were played on 26 and 27 January 1999, the second leg matches were played on 16  and 17 February 1999. It was a narrow victory for Tottenham Hotspur and Leicester City at the expense of Wimbledon and Sunderland, respectively, giving Tottenham the first chance of their major trophy–and place in Europe–for eight years, while Leicester had reached their second final in three seasons.

First leg

Second leg

Tottenham Hotspur win 1-0 on aggregate

Leicester City win 3-2 on aggregate

Final

The 1999 Worthington Cup Final was played on 21 March 1999 and was contested between  Tottenham Hotspur and Leicester City at Wembley Stadium. Tottenham won the match 1–0 thanks to a last minute Allan Nielsen header.

References

External links
Official Carling Cup website
Carling Cup at bbc.co.uk
League Cup news, match reports and pictures on Reuters.co.uk
Results on Soccerbase

1998-99
Cup
1998–99 domestic association football cups
Lea